Dehnow-e Hajj Ali Mohammad (also romanized as Dehnow-e Ḩājj ʿAlī Moḩammad; also known as Dehno) is a village in Sorkh Qaleh Rural District, in the Central District of Qaleh Ganj County, Kerman Province, Iran. At the 2006 census, its population was 221, in 48 families.

References 

Populated places in Qaleh Ganj County